Stoneycroft is small leafy district in the east of Liverpool, England and part of the  Tuebrook and Stoneycroft and Old Swan wards.

Description
Stoneycroft is a small residential district of Liverpool located to the east of the city. Liverpool's inner ring-road, Queens Drive, runs past Stoneycroft and creates a border between the area and West Derby. Stoneycroft is also bordered by Tuebrook and Old Swan.

Government
Stoneycroft is part of the Tuebrook and Stoneycroft ward. The elected councillors for the Tuebrook and Stoneycroft ward are councillors Carol Sung of the Labour Party, Steve Radford of the Liberal Party and Kevin John Morrison of the Liberal Party.

It is represented in the House of Commons in the parliamentary constituency of Liverpool West Derby.

See also
Church of St Paul

External links

Liverpool Street Gallery - Liverpool 13

Areas of Liverpool